TRIO and F-actin-binding protein is a protein that in humans is encoded by the TRIOBP gene.

This gene encodes a protein that interacts with Trio, which is involved with neural tissue development and in controlling actin cytoskeleton organization, cell motility, and cell growth. This trio-binding protein also associates with F-actin and stabilizes F-actin structures. Domains contained in this encoded protein are an N-terminal pleckstrin homology domain and a C-terminal coiled-coil region. Mutations in this gene have been associated with a form of autosomal-recessive nonsyndromic deafness. Multiple alternatively-spliced transcript variants that would encode different isoforms have been found for this gene, though some transcripts may be subject to nonsense-mediated decay (NMD).

References

Further reading